KCAJ-FM (102.1 FM, "Wild 102") is an adult contemporary formatted broadcast radio station licensed to Roseau, Minnesota, serving Northwest Minnesota, Southeast Manitoba, and Northwest Ontario.  KCAJ-FM is owned and operated by North Country Media. Studios and offices are at 107 Center St West, in downtown Roseau. Their transmitter site is along Highway 89 in Wannaska, MN.

References

External links
Wild 102 Online

1996 establishments in Minnesota
Mainstream adult contemporary radio stations in the United States
Radio stations established in 1996
Radio stations in Minnesota